Kasner's dwarf burrowing skink (Scelotes kasneri), also known commonly as Kasner's burrowing skink, is a species of lizard in the family Scincidae.

Geographic range
Scelotes kasneri is endemic to the Western Cape coast of South Africa.

Description
The limbs of S. kasneri are greatly reduced. The forelimbs are entirely lost, and the hind limbs retain only two digits.

Reproduction
S. kasneri is viviparous.

Etymology
The specific name, kasneri, as well as the common names, are in honor of J.H. Kasner, collector of the type specimen.

References

Further reading
Branch, Bill (2004). Field Guide to Snakes and other Reptiles of Southern Africa. Third Revised edition, Second impression. Sanibel Island, Florida: Ralph Curtis Books. 399 pp. . (Scelotes kasneri, p. 144 + Plate 48).
Heideman, Neil J.L.; Mulcahy, Daniel G.; Sites, Jack W. Jr.; Hendricks, Martin G.J.; Daniels, Savel R. (2011). "Cryptic diversity and morphological convergence in threatened species of fossorial skinks in the genus Scelotes (Squamata: Scincidae) from the Western Cape Coast of South Africa: Implications for species boundaries, digit reduction and conservation". Molecular Phylogenetics and Evolution 61 (3): 823–833.
FitzSimons VFM (1939). "Descriptions of some new species and subspecies of lizards from South Africa". Ann. Transvaal Mus. 20 (1): 5–16. (Scelotes kasneri, new species, p. 13).

Scelotes
Reptiles described in 1939
Endemic reptiles of South Africa
Taxa named by Vivian Frederick Maynard FitzSimons
Taxonomy articles created by Polbot